Chionopsyche is a genus of moths in the family Lasiocampidae. The genus was erected by Per Olof Christopher Aurivillius in 1909.

Species
Chionopsyche admirabile Zolotuhin, 2010
Chionopsyche grisea Aurivillius, 1914
Chionopsyche montana Aurivillius, 1909

External links

Lasiocampidae